"Behind the Ritual" is a song written by Northern Irish singer-songwriter Van Morrison and included as the ending track on his 2008 album, Keep It Simple. In concerts previewing the album, Morrison  used this song as a closer and continued to include it on the set lists of his concerts in 2008.

Composition
In the opening lines of the song, the singer is reminiscing of the youthful days in his career as when he fronted the band, Them.

The song's meaning and title are contained in the lines:

Critical reception
Reviewer Jeffrey Lee Puckett calls it "one of his trademark long and winding odes" and comments, "He's never messed with us more than he does on 'Behind the Ritual'.  At the point when Morrison would normally start improvising a key word or phrase, we get this: blah, blah, blah, blah, blah, blah repeated around 60 times."

In a review in the Buffalo News, Jeff Miers  writes:  "'Behind the Ritual' stands out as one of Morrison's finest.  Over a poised, shuffle groove the singer slurs, intones, dances around the edges of the meaning, his activity serving to shine a light on what is unstated much in the manner that the timeless 'Madame George' said so much with so little."

Another reviewer in The Mirror remarked: "'Behind the Ritual' is the killer. Drinking wine and dancing like a dervish Van finds 'the spiritual  behind the ritual.'"

Scott Foundas of LA Weekly writes that "it is not the least of Keep it Simple'''s accomplishments that it adds one trancelike classic in the making to the Morrison repertoire....it's fittingly the album closer...the song is called "Behind the Ritual" and like many of Morrison's best songs, this one points toward a destination.

Greil Marcus calls the song, "a strong statement of the power of simplicity, and moreover an assertion of Morrison's mastery."

Personnel
Van Morrisonvocals, alto saxophone, ukulele
Mick Greenguitar
John Allairorgan
Paul Moorebass
Neil Wilkinsondrums
Liam Bradleypercussion
Crawford Bellbacking vocals
Karen Hamillbacking vocals
Jerome Rimsonbacking vocals

Notes

References
Marcus, Greil (2010).  When That Rough God Goes Riding: Listening to Van Morrison'', Public Affairs,

External links
Van Morrison at Lost Highway Records -  full length track of "Behind the Ritual"

2008 songs
Van Morrison songs
Songs written by Van Morrison
Song recordings produced by Van Morrison